Xeranobium is a genus of death-watch beetles in the family Ptinidae. There are about 13 described species in Xeranobium.

Species
These 13 species belong to the genus Xeranobium:

 Xeranobium badium White, 1971
 Xeranobium californicum White, 1971
 Xeranobium cinereum (Horn, 1894)
 Xeranobium costatum White, 1971
 Xeranobium desertum Fall, 1905
 Xeranobium griseum White, 1971
 Xeranobium laticeps Fall, 1905
 Xeranobium macrum Fall, 1905
 Xeranobium oregonum Hatch, 1961
 Xeranobium parvum White, 1971
 Xeranobium poliotrichum White, 1971
 Xeranobium rufescens White, 1971
 Xeranobium sericatum White, 1971

References

Further reading

 
 
 
 

Anobiinae
Articles created by Qbugbot